Adjumani General Hospital, also Adjumani Hospital, is a hospital in Adjumani Town, Adjumani District, in the Northern Region of Uganda. It is a public hospital, owned by the Ugandan Government and is administered by the Uganda Ministry of Health.

Location

The geographical coordinates of Adjumani General Hospital are:03°22'27.0"N, 31°47'33.0"E (Latitude:3.374176; Longitude:31.792498).

Overview
Adjumani Hospital was constructed in 2000 with a loan from the African Development Bank. The facility sits on a land site that measures . It has a bed capacity of 100 and averages about 200 outpatient daily visits. About 10 babies are delivered daily on average. Major illnesses include malaria and respiratory infections. Patients come from as far away as South Sudan and people from the neighboring districts of Amuru and Moyo and those from Adjumani District itself.

See also
List of hospitals in Uganda

References

External links
 Website of Uganda Ministry of Health

Hospitals in Uganda
Adjumani District
West Nile sub-region
Northern Region, Uganda